Hippocampus tyro is a seahorse, a fish in the family Syngnathidae. The species is only known from a single specimen caught off of the coast of the Seychelles at a depth of between 43 and 48m.

References 

tyro
Taxa named by John Ernest Randall
Fish described in 2009
Fauna of Seychelles